Iron tris(dimethyldithiocarbamate) is the coordination complex of iron with dimethyldithiocarbamate with the formula Fe(S2CNMe2)3 (Me = methyl).  It is marketed as a  fungicide.

Synthesis, structure, bonding
Iron tris(dithiocarbamate)s are typically are prepared by salt metathesis reactions.

Iron tris(dimethyldithiocarbamate) is an octahedral coordination complex of iron(III) with D3 symmetry.

Spin crossover (SCO) was first observed in 1931 by Cambi et al. who discovered anomalous magnetic behavior for the tris(N,N-dialkyldithiocarbamatoiron(III) complexes. The spin states of these complexes are sensitive to the nature of the amine substituents.

Reactions
Iron tris(dithiocarbamate)s react with nitric oxide to give a nitrosyl complex:

This efficient chemical trapping reaction provides a means to detect NO.

Reflecting the strongly donating properties of dithiocarbamate ligands, iron tris(dithiocarbamate)s oxidize at relatively mild potentials to give isolable iron(IV) derivatives [Fe(S2CNR2)3]+.

Iron tris(dithiocarbamate)s react with hydrochloric acid to give the pentacoordinate chloride:

Safety
The U.S. Occupational Safety and Health Administration (OSHA) has set the legal (permissible exposure limit) for ferbam exposure in the workplace as 15 mg/m3 over an 8-hour workday. The U.S. National Institute for Occupational Safety and Health (NIOSH) has set a recommended exposure limit (REL) of 1 mg/m3 over an 8-hour workday. At levels of 800 mg/m3, ferbam is immediately dangerous to life and health.

See also
 Zinc dimethyldithiocarbamate - a related dimethyldithiocarbamate complex of zinc
 Nickel bis(dimethyldithiocarbamate) - a related dimethyldithiocarbamate complex of nickel
 Iron tris(diethyldithiocarbamate) - a related dimethyldithiocarbamate complex of iron

References

Fungicides
Dithiocarbamates
Iron(III) compounds
Iron complexes